Gouagnon Coulibaly is a member of the National Assembly of Mali, representing Kati, and a member of the Union for the Republic and Democracy political party.

He was the campaign manager for Soumaïla Cissé in the 2013 Malian presidential election. He accused Ibrahim Boubacar Keita of ballot stuffing during the campaign.

During the 2020 Malian protests, he has claimed to represent the M5-RFP coalition. When ECOWAS recommended the resignation of 31 Parliamentarians whose election in the 2020 Malian parliamentary election were disputed, he rejected the proposal, claiming it violated the Constitution of Mali.

References

Campaign managers
Living people
Members of the National Assembly (Mali)
Union for the Republic and Democracy politicians
Year of birth missing (living people)
21st-century Malian people